El Watan News is an Egyptian daily news portal published online by Future Publishing, Distribution, and Press. The portal provides breaking news reports, political analyses, and other general economic and entertainment coverage to an audience of Arabic speakers worldwide. Live, on-site video coverage and advertisements curated by Bawabat Al-Watan (the in-site ad agency) are as important to its journalistic mix as written articles. Journalist Mahmoud Muslim serves as the editor, and Future Media is owned by Mohamed Al-Amin. Magdi El Galad founded the site in 2012.

Reaction to Caricatures of Muhammad
After the release of Innocence of Muslims and the publication of caricatures of the prophet Muhammad in the French weekly Charlie Hebdo, El Watan News published a special issue including 15 five-panel cartoons in response. They were also published on the website, in addition to articles translated into Hebrew, German, English.

References

External links 

 

Egyptian news websites
2012 establishments in Egypt